Ulland Andersen is a surname. Notable people with the surname include:

Andreas Ulland Andersen (born 1989), Norwegian footballer
Eirik Ulland Andersen (born 1992), Norwegian footballer, brother of Andreas

Compound surnames
Norwegian-language surnames